The Ladder of Divine Ascent or Ladder of Paradise (Κλίμαξ; Scala or Climax Paradisi) is an important ascetical treatise for monasticism in Eastern Christianity, written by John Climacus in  AD; it was requested by John, Abbot of the Raithu monastery.

The Scala, which obtained an immense popularity and has made its author famous in the Church, is addressed to anchorites and cenobites and treats of the means by which the highest degree of religious perfection may be attained. Divided into thirty parts, or "steps", in memory of the thirty years of the life of Christ, the Divine model for the faithful Christian, it presents a picture of all the virtues and contains a great many parables and historical touches, drawn principally from the monastic life, and exhibiting the practical application of the precepts.

At the same time, as the work is mostly written in a concise, sententious form, with the aid of aphorisms, and as the reasonings are not sufficiently closely connected, it is at times somewhat obscure. This explains its having been the subject of various commentaries, even in very early times. The most ancient of the manuscripts containing the Scala is found in the Bibliothèque Nationale in Paris and was probably brought from Florence by Catherine de' Medici. In some of these manuscripts, the work bears the title of "Spiritual Tables" (Plakes pneumatikai).

Steps or Rungs on the Ladder to Heaven

The Scala consists of 30 chapters, or "rungs",
1–4: Renunciation of the world and obedience to a spiritual father
1. Περὶ ἀποταγῆς (On renunciation of the world, or asceticism)
2. Περὶ ἀπροσπαθείας (On detachment)
3. Περὶ ξενιτείας (On exile or pilgrimage; concerning dreams that beginners have)
4. Περὶ ὑπακοῆς (On blessed and ever-memorable obedience (in addition to episodes involving many individuals))
5–7: Penitence and affliction (πένθος) as paths to true joy
5. Περὶ μετανοίας (On painstaking and true repentance, which constitutes the life of the holy convicts, and about the Prison)
6. Περὶ μνήμης θανάτου (On remembrance of death)
7. Περὶ τοῦ χαροποιοῦ πένθους (On joy-making mourning)
8–17: Defeat of vices and acquisition of virtue
8. Περἰ ἀοργησίας (On freedom from anger and on meekness)
9. Περἰ μνησικακίας (On remembrance of wrongs)
10. Περἰ καταλαλιᾶς (On slander or calumny)
11. Περὶ πολυλογίας καἰ σιωπῆς (On talkativeness and silence)
12. Περὶ ψεύδους (On lying)
13. Περὶ ἀκηδίας (On despondency)
14. Περὶ γαστριμαργίας (On that clamorous mistress, the stomach)
15. Περὶ ἀγνείας (On incorruptible purity and chastity, to which the corruptible attain by toil and sweat)
16. Περὶ φιλαργυρίας (On love of money, or avarice)
17. Περὶ ἀκτημοσύνης (On non-possessiveness (that hastens one Heavenwards))
18–26: Avoidance of the traps of asceticism (laziness, pride, mental stagnation)
18. Περὶ ἀναισθησίας (On insensibility, that is, deadening of the soul and the death of the mind before the death of the body)
19. Περὶ ὕπνου καὶ προσευχῆς (On sleep, prayer, and psalmody with the brotherhood)
20. Περὶ ἀγρυπνίας (On bodily vigil and how to use it to attain spiritual vigil, and how to practice it)
21. Περὶ δειλίας (On unmanly and puerile cowardice)
22. Περὶ κενοδοξίας (On the many forms of vainglory)
23. Περὶ ὑπερηφανείας, Περὶ λογισμῶν βλασφημίας (On mad pride and (in the same Step) on unclean blasphemous thoughts; concerning unmentionable blasphemous thoughts)
24. Περὶ πραότητος και ἁπλότητος (On meekness, simplicity, and guilelessness, which come not from nature but from conscious effort, and on guile)
25. Περὶ ταπεινοφροσύνης (On the destroyer of the passions, most sublime humility, which is rooted in spiritual perception)
26. Περὶ διακρίσεως (On discernment of thoughts, passions and virtues; on expert discernment; brief summary of all aforementioned)
27–29: Acquisition of hesychia, or peace of the soul, of prayer, and of apatheia (dispassion or equanimity with respect to afflictions or suffering)
27. Περὶ ἡσυχίας (On holy stillness of body and soul; different aspects of stillness and how to distinguish them)
28. Περὶ προσευχῆς (On holy and blessed prayer, the mother of virtues, and on the attitude of mind and body in prayer)
29. Περὶ ἀπαθείας (Concerning Heaven on earth, or Godlike dispassion and perfection, and the resurrection of the soul before the general resurrection)
30. Περὶ ἀγάπης, ἐλπίδος και πίστεως (Concerning the linking together of the supreme trinity among the virtues; a brief exhortation summarizing all that has said at length in this book)

It was translated into Latin by Ambrogio the Camaldolese (Ambrosius Camaldulensis) (Venice, 1531 and 1569; Cologne, 1583, 1593, with a commentary by Denis the Carthusian; and 1601). The Greek of the Scala, with the scholia of Elias, Archbishop of Crete, and also the text of the "Liber ad Pastorem", were published by Matthæus Raderus with a Latin translation (Paris, 1633). The whole is reproduced in Patrologia Graeca, vol. 88 (Paris, 1860). Translations of the Scala have been published in Spanish by Louis of Granada (Salamanca, 1551), in Italian (Venice, 1585), in modern Greek by Maximus Margunius, Bishop of Cerigo (Venice, 1590), and in French by Arnauld d'Andilly (Paris, 1688). The last-named of these translations is preceded by a life of the saint by Le Maistre de Sacy.
One translation of the Scala, La Escala Espiritual de San Juan Clímaco, became the first book printed in the Americas, in 1532.

English language editions

The Ladder of Divine Ascent, published by Holy Transfiguration Monastery. This edition, based on Archimandrite Lazarus Moore's translation is generally preferred over the Paulist Press edition of the Ladder—especially because of the verse numberings, which are the standard way of referencing Climacus's sayings (these are also present in older versions of Archimandrite Lazarus's translation). It contains an icon of The Ladder, many other embellishments, and is printed on high quality paper. The Paulist Press edition contains an introduction by Bishop Kallistos.

Luibheid, Colm; Russell, Norman. John Climacus: The Ladder of Divine Ascent. Paulist Press. 
Mack, John. Ascending the Heights: A Layman's Guide to the Ladder of Divine Ascent.

Analysis of the Iconography
The Ladder of Divine Ascent derived from manuscripts of the 11th and 12th century, pictorially bringing insight to heaven from a 30 rung ladder. The strategic placement of the ladder which cuts the icon into two complementary triangles, representing heaven in the higher triangular module and earth in the lower. The journey to the top of the ladder where Jesus reaches with open hands is rife with obstacles of sin represented by the demons with bow and arrows ready to take the souls of those who lack perseverance. The imagery is figurative in the sense that the demons represented visually in the icon are the sins that man battles with internally. In this case the monks that climb each rung with pain as they reach new heights. The act of climbing represents physical pain as well which is true of any exercise that defies gravity. In this sense the weight the monks feel is physical, mental, and spiritual. The icon shows several examples of monks that gave into temptation of sin as the demons with dark chains hoist their victims off the ladder and into hell. These battles are represented visually between the monks and their sin. Lord Nikon shows leadership through perseverance as he reaches the top rung. His inspirational position close to Christ serves as a guide to those still struggling in their journey. Between the danger of climbing the ladder is a group of brothers gathered at the lower right, arms raised in prayer to the angels above in the upper left. This represents the thoughts and prayers that cut through the battlefield giving support to those on the path to heaven by way of virtue. A life based on prayer and penance as the way to salvation is the virtue they live by. The angels above to the left represent the righteous climbing the ladder below in the same way that the holy brethren to the lower right mirror the angels above.

At the top of the ladder is archbishop Holy Antonios in a white robe with golden trim embracing the invitation to heaven with God. The white robe that archbishop Antonios wears is of silk with gold cuffs or "epimanikia" and a sash or "epitrachelion" that distinguishes himself from the others on the ascent. The imperial status held by archbishop Antonios implies a close relation to the icon itself. A symbol of his prominence within the religious community. His hands are lifted openly to mirror the grace Christ has given him. Lord Nikon is in front of the archbishop and leads the same hand gesture. Many inscriptions state that Lord Nikon has been "made one with God". The icon has been venerated with Lord Nikon in mind as much as archbishop Antonios. According to Hans Belting it is not known if archbishop Antonios came from the capital of Sinai or was even an archbishop. Those that suggest he was the archbishop include Doula Mouriki for one. This controversy remains today over the imperial patronage of the icon.

Arabic Translation
The Heavenly Ladder was translated as an icon for the Arabic speaking religious community probably at Sinai's Saint Catherine's monastery. John Climacus leads his people through text on the left side of the page to show the Greek tradition instead of the text from the right like the Arabic tradition. He doesn't sit on the floor like the Muslims but rather at a desk. This is complemented with a smaller adaptation of the icon. The reproduction shows Christ leading the pious to heaven from a ladder that cuts the icon from bottom right to upper left in ascending fashion. This is the opposite of the original icon of the late 12th century. This 17th century Arabic icon is colorful with its imagery. Moses is depicted kneeling before the burning bush at the right. The virgin Mary and Christ child are illuminated inside the tear shaped flame. John Climacus is seen at the lower left with fellow monks at St. Catherine. At the base of the ladder a monk falling to hell maintains footing on the ladder as St. John Climacus assists by grabbing hold of the demon.

See also
 Anchorite
 Cenobite
 Orthodox Monastic Orders
 Great chain of being, or the scala natura (ladder of nature)
 Hesychasm
 Jacob's Ladder
 Matarta in Mandaeism
 Philokalia
 Stoic passions
 Codex Climaci Rescriptus

References

Fr. John Mack, Ascending the Heights — A Layman's Guide to The Ladder of Divine Ascent, .
Nelson, Robert; Collins, Kristen (2006). Icons From Sinai: Holy Image and Hallowed Ground. Los Angeles: Getty Trust Publications.
Evans, Helen; Wixom, William (1997). The Glory of Byzantium: Art and Culture of the Middle Byzantine Era, A.D. 843-1261. New York: Metropolitan Museum of Art.

Notes

External links

The Ladder of Divine Ascent Translated by Archimandrite Lazarus Moore (Harper & Brothers, 1959)
OrthodoxWiki

7th-century books
Christian devotional literature
Eastern Orthodox spirituality
Hesychast literature
Ladders